Eden is the fourth studio album by American rapper Cupcakke, released on November 9, 2018. It is Cupcakke's second album of 2018, following January's Ephorize. It includes the singles "Quiz" and "Blackjack".

Background
The album follows CupcakKe's announcement and subsequent of her plans to tour with Iggy Azalea on her Bad Girls Tour, which was later canceled after Azalea's then-management failed to pay the promised $330,000 for the tour. Cupcakke then announced that she would be going on her own tour after her album is released.

Promotion
Cupcakke announced the album on Instagram, along with sharing a picture of herself covered in chocolate sauce and sprinkles while eating a strawberry, which was revealed to be the cover art.

Critical reception

On Metacritic, the album has a score of 77, indicating "generally favorable reviews" based on five reviews. Ani Blum of Pitchfork rated the album 7.9 out of 10 and called its songs "slathered in sex", writing: "Each track on Eden propels into the next, and her flow stays tight, whether she's cooing or shouting. It is a masterclass in control." Blum ended the review by complimenting Cupcakke's ability to go "from a condemnation of police brutality in one minute to a line about a dick the size of Ariana Grande's ponytail in the next. That ability to blend the real and the absurd, the cartoon and the corporeal, distinguishes CupcakKe from any other rapper."

Track listing
Credits adapted from BMI and ASCAP.

Notes
 "A.U.T.I.S.M" is stylized as "A U T I S M" on some digital streaming platforms.

References

2018 albums
Cupcakke albums